Taekwondo at the 2016 Summer Olympics in Rio de Janeiro took place from 17 to 20 August at the Carioca Arena 3 inside the Barra Olympic Park in Barra da Tijuca. Around 128 taekwondo fighters competed in eight weight categories; four for men, and four for women.

Qualification

Taekwondo competition at these Games featured a total of 128 athletes, 64 in each gender, and 16 in each of the eight weight categories. Each National Olympic Committee (NOC) was allowed to enter up to a maximum of eight competitors, four of each gender, based on the World Taekwondo Federation (WTF) Olympic rankings, such that an athlete per NOC must be among the top six in each weight category. If an NOC had qualified only two female and male athletes through ranking, it could not participate in the respective Continental Qualification Tournament unless it had relinquishing the places obtained through ranking.

Four places had been reserved to the host nation Brazil, and another four had been invited by the Tripartite Commission. The remaining 120 places were allocated through a qualification process in which athletes had won quota place for their respective NOC. 48 taekwondo fighters, 24 in each gender and the top 6 in each weight category, were eligible to compete through the ITTF Olympic rankings, while the rest through the five Continental Qualification Tournaments.

If an NOC having qualified through a Qualification Tournament relinquishing a quota place, it would be allocated to the nation of the next highest placed athlete in the respective weight category of that tournament as long as the addition of the place did not exceed the maximum quota for that nation.

Schedule

Participating

Participating nations

Competitors

Medal summary
After finishing in third in 2012, this Olympics marks South Korea's return to the top of the Taekwondo medal standings.

Medal table

Men's events

Women's events

References

External links

 
 
 World Taekwondo Federation
 NBC Olympics: Taekwondo
 Results Book – Taekwondo

 
2016 Summer Olympics events
2016
Taekwondo competitions in Brazil
2016 in taekwondo